Tyrosine-protein kinase-like 7 also known as colon carcinoma kinase 4 (CCK4) is a receptor tyrosine kinase that in humans is encoded by the PTK7 gene.

Function 

Receptor protein tyrosine kinases transduce extracellular signals across the cell membrane. A subgroup of these kinases lack detectable catalytic tyrosine kinase activity but retain roles in signal transduction. The protein encoded by this gene an intracellular domain with tyrosine kinase homology and may function as a cell adhesion molecule. This gene is thought to be expressed in colon carcinomas but not in normal colon, and therefore may be a marker for or may be involved in tumor progression. Four transcript variants encoding four different isoforms have been found for this gene.

PTK7 serves as a context-dependent signalling switch for the Wnt pathways (particularly in planar cell polarity related functions such as convergent extension and neural crest cell migration) and appears to have similar functions for plexin and Flt-1 pathways. PTK7 was identified to be highly expressed in colon cancer by Saha et al. using serial analysis of gene expression (LongSAGE). Pfizer is targeting PTK7 for cancer by generating an antibody-drug conjugate against the PTK7 receptor.

References

Further reading 

 
 
 
 
 
 
 

Tyrosine kinase receptors